James Alan Crawford (13 February 1948 in Dunfermline, Fife – 6 August 2002 in Tierra Verde, Florida, United States) was a British racing driver from Scotland.

His first motorsport experience came behind the wheel of a Mini that he drove in several rallies. After an unsuccessful stint in Formula Ford he landed a drive in his friend Stephen Choularton's team in Formula Atlantic, after showing great promise in a couple of Formula Libre races at Croft. He went on to spend a number of years driving alongside Choularton at SDC Racing in Formula Atlantic and was spotted by Lotus Cars and offered a test drive by them.

He participated in two World Championship Formula One Grands Prix, debuting on 19 July 1975. He was also the winner of the 1982 British Formula One Championship. He is notable for being the 500th person to start a Formula One World Championship race.

Crawford moved to the United States in the early 1980s, finishing runner-up twice in the Can-Am series. He finished fourth on his CART debut at Long Beach in 1984 and went on to become a regular in the Indianapolis 500. It was there in 1987 that Crawford suffered a crash in practice which resulted in serious leg injuries. However, he recovered sufficiently to return to the 500 in 1988, leading the race for a few laps. A late race puncture dropped him from 2nd to 6th.

Crawford's final 500 was in 1993, although he made unsuccessful attempts to qualify old cars in 1994 and 1995.

1988 Indianapolis 500

Crawford's most notable run at Indy occurred in 1988. After nearly a year of rehabilitation from leg and foot injuries, Crawford returned for the 1988 Indianapolis 500. He signed with King Racing as a teammate to Johnny Rutherford, driving a Buick entry. He was a last-minute addition to the team, joining just prior to opening day. He made little headlines during time trials, quietly making the field late on the second day. He was still recovering from his leg injuries, and walked the month with the aid of a cane.

On race day, however, Crawford created quite a stir. The race was dominated by the Penske Team, however, Crawford was in contention all afternoon, and was the only driver other than the Penske cars to lead laps during the race. Crawford took the lead near the midpoint, and led 8 laps. He drove a highly aggressive race, dicing in and out of traffic at will, and frequently dropping well below the white lines in the turns. Crawford set a blistering pace during his stint in the lead, and was running second as late as lap 194. With six laps to go, he got sideways in turn three, and flat-spotted his tires. He ducked into the pits for new tires, but the crew had difficulties, and he lost several seconds. He lost a lap, and finished 6th. It was the highest finish at the time for the Buick V-6 Indy engine, and Crawford was praised for his strong effort.

Later years

Crawford returned to Indy in 1989 with high expectations after his 1988 performance. He qualified 4th, the highest of the non-Chevrolet teams, but dropped out with mechanical problems on race day.

In 1990, Crawford joined the Menard team, and during practice, suffered a spectacular crash. He spun and hit the wall in turn one, then became airborne 10–15 feet above the ground in the south short chute. He was not seriously injured. He finished 15th on race day.

Crawford's final notable appearance at Indy was in 1992. Crawford re-joined the King Racing team, as a teammate to Roberto Guerrero driving once again the Buick V-6 engine. Crawford and Guerrero led the speed charts all through practice, with Crawford setting an all-time unofficial track record of 233.433 mph. Both drivers were heavy favourites for the pole position, but on the morning of pole day, Crawford blew an engine. Rain pushed time trials into the next day, which gave the team time to install a new engine. However, on the second day, he blew another engine, and wound up missing his opportunity to qualify during the pole round. He qualified 6th fastest, but as a second day qualifier, lined up 21st. On race day, he was a factor early, but crashed out on lap 75 collecting Rick Mears.

The 1988 race would end up being Crawford's best Indy car finish (6th), and his final start came in 1993. He failed to qualify in 1994–1995, and retired from driving.

Personal life
After retirement from racing, Crawford lived in St. Petersburg, Florida, where he bought a fishing boat he used for charters. He died in 2002 of liver failure. He was survived by his second wife Annie and his children from his first marriage, Geoffrey and Emily.

Racing record

Complete Formula One World Championship results
(key)

Complete Formula One non-championship results
(key)

Complete European Formula Two Championship results
(key) (Races in bold indicate pole position; races in italics indicate fastest lap)

Complete Shellsport International Series results
(key) (Races in bold indicate pole position; races in italics indicate fastest lap)

Complete British Formula One Championship results
(key) (Races in bold indicate pole position; races in italics indicate fastest lap)

Complete World Sportscar Championship results
(key) (Races in bold indicate pole position) (Races in italics indicate fastest lap)

American open-wheel racing
(key) (Races in bold indicate pole position)

PPG Indy Car World Series

Indianapolis 500

References

External links
 

1948 births
2002 deaths
Scottish racing drivers
Scottish Formula One drivers
Team Lotus Formula One drivers
British Formula One Championship drivers
European Formula Two Championship drivers
Indianapolis 500 drivers
Champ Car drivers
Sportspeople from Dunfermline
Sportspeople from St. Petersburg, Florida